Stigmella amygdali is a moth of the family Nepticulidae. It is found in Greece (including the mainland, Rhodes and Crete).

The larvae feed on Prunus dulcis. They mine the leaves of their host plant. The beginning of the mine is a small corridor, mostly following a vein. The later mine is less straight, with a more diffuse frass line that usually leaves a clear zone at either side. The mine is proportionally short. Pupation takes place outside of the mine.

External links
bladmineerders.nl
Fauna Europaea

Nepticulidae
Moths of Europe
Moths described in 1978